The International SeaKeepers Society is an international charitable organization founded in 1998. The group was started by yacht owners with an initial focus on developing and utilizing instrumentation on yachts to monitor marine conditions in the ocean. Today, The International SeaKeepers Society continues to work with yachts. The International SeaKeepers Society is a 501(c)(3) organization. The organization works with governments, educational institutions, private foundations, and non-profit organizations.

History
Founding members of the International SeaKeepers Society include Alexander Dreyfoos, Alfred H. Balm, Richard DeVos, Jan Moran and Bruce McCaw. A monitoring unit called the SeaKeeper 1000 was deployed on more than 90 platforms across the globe including yachts, cruise ships, buoys, and piers. While the SeaKeeper 1000 was active, the National Oceanic and Atmospheric Administration and the U.S. National Weather Service utilized the SeaKeeper 1000 on many of their NOAA vessels to better monitor oceanographic changes. The International SeaKeepers Society discontinued the SeaKeeper 1000 in October 2013.

SeaKeeper 1000
The SeaKeeper 1000 unit was designed to record weather and near surface oceanographic data automatically. It then transmitted the data via NOAA satellites and through the Global Telecommunication System (GTS). The SeaKeeper 1000 unit won the 2002 Environment Award from The Tech Museum of Innovation. In 2002, 61 society members and 4 cruise lines had installed SeaKeeper 1000, and 14 yacht manufacturers had agreed to include the technology on their boats/ships.

BP oil spill
In response to the Deepwater Horizon oil spill, the Society with the assistance of researchers at the University of South Florida and environmental sensor company YSI were able to attach and interface a hydrocarbon sensor to the SeaKeeper 1000 environmental monitor in June 2010.

Partnerships
On March 26, 2010 SeaKeepers formed an alliance with Yachts International Magazine to expand the Society's mission and to expand science-based understanding and analysis of global climate change.

In 2012, SeaKeepers partnered with the Volvo Ocean Race.

References

External links
 

Marine conservation organizations
Environmental organizations based in Florida
Nature conservation organizations based in the United States
Yachting associations
International environmental organizations
Non-profit organizations based in Florida
Environmental organizations established in 1998
1998 establishments in Florida
501(c)(3) organizations